"Moth into Flame" is a song by heavy metal band Metallica and the second single from their tenth studio album, Hardwired... to Self-Destruct. The song debuted during the band's appearance on The Howard Stern Show on September 26, 2016, with the official music video being uploaded to the band's official YouTube page hours later. The song made its live debut at Webster Hall on September 27, 2016, the 30th anniversary of former bassist Cliff Burton's death.

The song was used as the official theme song for American television company TBS's ELeague, for both the second season of the program and the ELeague Counter-Strike Major. Metallica performed the song with Lady Gaga at the 59th Annual Grammy Awards on February 12, 2017, which was fraught with difficulties as Hetfield's microphone was not functional for almost half of the performance. Hetfield threw down his guitar in anger as the band left the stage. With permission from the Grammys and CBS, both artists were allowed to upload the rehearsal performance, which did not include any technical difficulties, as well as a "fixed" version of the original performance, which included the soundboard recording mixed in with the broadcast version.

Background 
James Hetfield stated that Amy Winehouse had served as inspiration for the song after he had watched the 2015 documentary film Amy. "The song was somewhat inspired by the Amy Winehouse documentary, 'Amy'. When I watched it, it really made me sad that a talented person like that fell for the fame part of it. But, to some degree, I see that mentality reflected in daily lives".

Personnel
James Hetfield – lead vocals, rhythm guitar
Kirk Hammett – lead guitar
Robert Trujillo – bass, backing vocals
Lars Ulrich – drums

Charts

References 

2016 songs
Metallica songs
2016 singles
Songs written by James Hetfield
Songs written by Lars Ulrich